Events from the year 1928 in Michigan.

Office holders

State office holders
 Governor of Michigan: Fred W. Green (Republican)
 Lieutenant Governor of Michigan: Luren Dickinson (Republican) 
 Michigan Attorney General: William W. Potter
 Michigan Secretary of State: John S. Haggerty (Republican)
 Speaker of the Michigan House of Representatives: Fred R. Ming (Republican)
 Chief Justice, Michigan Supreme Court:

Mayors of major cities
 Mayor of Detroit: John C. Lodge
 Mayor of Grand Rapids: 
 Mayor of Flint: William H. McKeighan
 Mayor of Lansing: Laird J. Troyer
 Mayor of Saginaw:

Federal office holders

 U.S. Senator from Michigan: James J. Couzens (Republican)
 U.S. Senator from Michigan: Woodbridge N. Ferris (Democrat)/Arthur Vandenberg (Republican) 
 House District 1: Robert H. Clancy (Republican)
 House District 2: Earl C. Michener (Republican)
 House District 3: Joseph L. Hooper (Republican)
 House District 4: John C. Ketcham (Republican)
 House District 5: Carl E. Mapes (Republican)
 House District 6: Grant M. Hudson (Republican)
 House District 7: Louis C. Cramton (Republican)
 House District 8: Bird J. Vincent (Republican)
 House District 9: James C. McLaughlin (Republican)
 House District 10: Roy O. Woodruff (Republican)
 House District 11: Frank P. Bohn (Republican)
 House District 12: W. Frank James (Republican)
 House District 13: Clarence J. McLeod (Republican)

Population

Sports

Baseball
 1928 Detroit Tigers season – Under manager George Moriarty, the Tigers compiled a 68–88 record and finished in sixth place in the American League. The team's statistical leaders included Harry Heilmann with a .328 batting average, 14 home runs and 107 RBIs, and Ownie Carroll with 16 wins and a 3.27 earned run average.

American football
 1928 Detroit Wolverines - Under head coach LeRoy Andrews, the Wolverines compiled a 7–2–1 record during the 1928 NFL season. Benny Friedman led the team in scoring with 55 points scored.
 1928 Detroit Titans football team – Under head coach Gus Dorais, the Titans compiled a 9–0 record, shut out seven opponents, and outscored all opponents by a combined 267 to 27. The Titans defeated Michigan State by a 39 to 0 score.
 1928 Michigan State Normal Normalites football team - Under head coach Elton Rynearson, the Normalites compiled a record of 7–1, won the Michigan Collegiate Conference championship, and outscored opponents by a total of 233 to 43. 
 1928 Western State Hilltoppers football team – Under head coach Earl Martineau, the Hilltoppers compiled a 5–2 record and outscored their opponents, 119 to 32.
 1928 Central State Bearcats football team - Under head coach Wallace Parker, the Bearcats compiled a 6–3 record and outscored their opponents by a combined total of 126 to 73.

 1928 Michigan Wolverines football team – The Wolverines compiled a 3–4–1 record and tied for seventh place in the Big Ten Conference. Left tackle Otto Pommerening was an All-American.
 1928 Michigan State Spartans football team – Under head coach Harry Kipke, the Spartans compiled a 3–4–1 record.

Basketball
 1927–28 Michigan Wolverines men's basketball team – Under head coach E. J. Mather, the Wolverines compiled a 10–7 record and were co-champions of the Big Ten Conference.

Ice hockey
 1927–28 Detroit Cougars season – Under general manager and coach Jack Adams, the Cougars compiled a 19–19–6 record. George Hay led the team with 22 goals, 13 assists, and 35 points. Hap Holmes was the team's goaltender.

Chronology of events

January

February

March
 March 31 - Arthur Vandenberg was appointed by Governor Fred W. Green to the position of interim United States Senator to fill the vacancy caused by Woodbridge N. Ferris' death.

April

May

June

July

August

September

October

November
 November 6 - A number of elections occurred, including:
 United States Senate - Incumbent Republican United States Senator Arthur Vandenberg was for the first time elected to the Senate after being appointed to replace the deceased Woodbridge N. Ferris.
 Michigan Governor - Incumbent Republican governor, Fred W. Green, defeated Democratic nominee William Comstock.

 November 30 - 14 customs inspectors were arrested in Detroit accused of graft in connection with allowing the flow of rum from Canada. Reports indicated that 100 of the 129 inspectors in Detroit were suspected of graft.

December

Births
 March 15 - Paul Carey, sportcaster and play-by-play announcer for Detroit Tigers (1973-1991), in Mount Pleasant, Michigan
 May 26 - Jack Kevorkian, pathologist and euthanasia proponent known as "Dr. Death", in Pontiac, Michigan
 June 16 - Jerome Cavanagh, Mayor of Detroit (1962-1970), in Detroit
 September 4 - Dick York, actor (Darrin Stephens on Bewitched), in East Grand Rapids
 October 1 - George Peppard, actor (Breakfast at Tiffany's, The A-Team), in Detroit
 November 12 - Bill Muncey, hydroplane racer who won 62 races, in Detroit
 November 15 - James H. Brickley, 62nd Chief Justice of the Michigan Supreme Court, in Flint

Deaths
 February 1 - Hughie Jennings, manager of Detroit Tigers (1907-1929), at age 58 in Scranton, Pennsylvania
 March 23 - Woodbridge N. Ferris, U.S. Senator who died in office, at age 75 in Washington, D.C.
 July 18 - Ed Killian, pitcher for Detroit Tigers (1904-1910) with career ERA of 2.38, at age 51 in Racine, Wisconsin
 September 21 - Frederick C. Martindale, former Michigan Secretary of State, at 62 via suicide

See also
 History of Michigan
 History of Detroit

References